South Bazar or South Bazaar is an important junction market area in Kannur city of Kerala state in South India. South Bazar is a marketplace that is on the National Highway 66 from Kannur towards Taliparamba.

Caltex Junction is one of the busiest  junction area in Kannur city. The National Highway 66, Collectrate road and Stadium road joins at this Junction, and this place is close to government administrative offices and the Taluk Office in Kannur. Kerala State Road Transport Corporation (KSRTC) Bus Stand, Kannur is located at this junction. Apart from numerous grocery stores, South Bazar also has a number of automobile showrooms such as Hero Honda, Bajaj, and Maruti.

One can also find a branch of the Indian Coffee House in South Bazar.

This place is considered as a heart of Kannur city.

Future Development
South Bazar (Caltex Junction) being one of the busiest junction in the Kannur city, so a new flyover has been proposed over the junction to ease the traffic congestion.

Satellite image
Satellite image of South Bazar

See also
Kannur
Kannur District
Taliparamba

Image gallery

References

Suburbs of Kannur